The Clearwater Threshers are a Minor League Baseball team of the Florida State League and the Single-A affiliate of the Philadelphia Phillies. They are located in Clearwater, Florida, and have played their home games at BayCare Ballpark since 2004. They previously played at Jack Russell Memorial Stadium from 1985 to 2003.

The team began play in 1985 as the Clearwater Phillies and were named for their Major League Baseball affiliate. Clearwater became the Threshers in 2004 when the team moved to the new Spectrum Field.

Clearwater Phillies

Clearwater city officials approached the Philadelphia Phillies as early as 1981 about locating a Phillies minor league affiliate at Jack Russell Stadium in Clearwater. In July 1982, in a visit to Philadelphia, Clearwater city officials and the president of the Florida State League again asked the Philadelphia Phillies about affiliating with a team to be based in Clearwater. The Amateur Softball Association Clearwater Bombers had long used Jack Russell Stadium during the summer months when the field would be reconfigured for softball. The placement of a minor league baseball team would mean the relocation of the Bombers.

The Florida State League granted the city of Clearwater a franchise on September 26, 1984. The Clearwater Phillies began play in 1985 after the Philadelphia Phillies ended their affiliation with their High Class A minor league team, the Carolina League Peninsula Pilots, based in Hampton, Virginia, and placed their new team at Jack Russell Stadium. The Philadelphia Phillies owned the franchise and named the club the Clearwater Phillies. The Clearwater Phillies played their first game on April 12, 1985, at home, against the Tampa Tarpons.

The club played as the Clearwater Phillies through the 2003 season. The Phillies planned to leave Jack Russell Memorial Stadium after the 2003 season to move into a new ballpark, Baycare Ballpark, adjacent to the Carpenter Complex, the Phillies' minor league training facility. With the move to the new ballpark, the Clearwater Phillies were renamed the "Threshers" and adopted a new team logo and colors.

Threshers and Spectrum Field

In 2004, the Clearwater Threshers were managed by former Phillies player and Hall of Famer, Mike Schmidt. Greg Legg managed the team in 2005 and 2006. Dave Huppert was the manager in 2007, and Razor Shines in 2008. Ernie Whitt was named the manager for the 2009 season after Shines was promoted to base coach for the New York Mets.

In 2007, the Threshers won the second half in the FSL West Division. They defeated the Sarasota Reds (2–1) in the FSL West Division Playoffs, then defeated the Brevard County Manatees 3 games to 1 in the FSL Championship Series (best-of-five) to win the FSL title. The Threshers were named MiLB.com's Class A Advanced Team of the Year.

A single-game attendance record of 9,090 was set on July 3, 2008.

On July 26, 2009, Pedro Martínez made a rehab start for the Threshers against the St. Lucie Mets at Spectrum Field. Martinez pitched 1 innings before rain caused the game to be canceled, wiping out the official record of his start. Martinez subsequently moved to the Lehigh Valley IronPigs for his next start.

On May 23, 2011, The Threshers gained national attention after playing in a 23-inning game against the Jupiter Hammerheads.

Season-by-season
These statistics are current through the 2018 season.

Full season

Split season

Roster

Notable Clearwater Phillies and Threshers alumni

Baseball Hall of Fame alumni 
 Pedro Martinez (2009) inducted, 2015
 Mike Schmidt (2004, MGR) inducted, 1995
 Jim Thome (2005, 2012) inducted, 2018

Notable alumni
 Philippe Aumont
 Ricky Bottalico (1993) MLB All-Star
 Jeff Brantley (2000) MLB All-Star
 Pat Burrell (1998)
 Paul Byrd (2001) MLB All-Star
 Drew Carpenter (2007) 
 Carlos Carrasco
 Danny Cox (1991) 
 Darren Daulton (1987, 1996) 3 x MLB All-Star
 Johnny Estrada (1999) MLB All-Star
 Tom Gordon (2006–2008) 3 x MLB All-Star
 Jason Grimsley (1988) 
 Cole Hamels (2003-2006, 2014) 4 x MLB All-Star; 2008 World Series Most Valuable Player
 J. A. Happ (2006, 2010)
 Von Hayes (1990) MLB All-Star
 Ryan Howard (2003) 3 x MLB All-Star; 2005 NL Rookie of the Year; 2006 NL Most Valuable Player
 Kyle Kendrick (2005–2006)
 Scott Kingery (2016)
 Cliff Lee (2014) 4 x MLB All-Star; 2008 Cy Young Award
 Mike Lieberthal (1991) 2 x MLB All-Star
 Chuck McElroy (1987)
 Scott Mathieson
 Mickey Morandini (1989) MLB All-Star
 Nick Punto (1999) 
 Elizardo Ramirez
 Chris Roberson
 Scott Rolen (1995) 7 x MLB All-Star; 8 x Gold Glove; 1997 NL Rookie of the Year
 Jimmy Rollins (1998, 2008, 2010) 3 x MLB All-Star; 2007 NL Most Valuable Player
 Curt Schilling (1996, 2000) 6 x MLB All-Star; 2001 World Series Most Valuable Player
 Michael Schwimer
 Carlos Silva (2000)
 Alfredo Simón MLB All-Star
 Chase Utley (2001, 2010–2012) 6 x MLB All-Star
 Jayson Werth (2007–2008) MLB All-Star
Luke Williams
 Mitch Williams (1996) MLB All-Star
 Randy Wolf (2003, 2006) MLB All-Star
 Mike Zagurski

Former coaches and trainers
Mike Schmidt (manager – 2004) W-L: 55–81
Greg Legg (manager 2005–2006) W-L: 108–167
Dave Huppert (manager 2007) W-L: 83–57 / League Champions
Razor Shines (manager 2008) W-L: 64–76
Dan Roberts (hitting coach 2004–2005)
Greg Gross (hitting coach 2006)
Brad Komminsk (hitting coach 2007)
Steve Schrenk (pitching coach 2004 and 2007–2008)

References

Further reading

External links

 
 Statistics from Baseball-Reference

 
Philadelphia Phillies minor league affiliates
Florida State League teams
Baseball teams established in 1985
1985 establishments in Florida
Baseball teams in Clearwater, Florida